PAL Airlines (legally Aerolínea Principal Chile S.A.) was a Chilean airline that operated out of Arturo Merino Benítez International Airport in Santiago. The airline operated from 2003 to 2014, when it ceased all operations.

History

The airline was established as a charter airline in September 2003 and received approval for scheduled services in June 2009. It was owned by the Musiet family, who in the 1990s owned now-defunct National Airlines.

The airline ceased operations in September 2014 by the Directorate General of Civil Aeronautics due to unfavourable market conditions. In early 2015 it was declared bankrupt by a Chilean court.

Destinations

PAL Airlines served the following scheduled destinations within Chile:
Antofagasta - Cerro Moreno International Airport
Calama - El Loa Airport
Copiapó - Desierto de Atacama Airport
Iquique - Diego Aracena International Airport
Santiago - Arturo Merino Benitez International Airport - Hub

Additionally, the airline operated charter flights, mainly to Punta Cana.

Fleet

The PAL Airlines fleet consisted of the following aircraft:

See also
List of defunct airlines of Chile

References

External links

Official website

Defunct airlines of Chile
PAL
Airlines disestablished in 2014
2014 disestablishments in Chile
Chilean companies established in 2003